HMS Undine was a Modified Admiralty  destroyer that served in the Royal Navy during the First World War. The Modified R class added attributes of the Yarrow Later M class to improve the capability of the ships to operate in bad weather. Launched in 1917, the destroyer served in the Grand Fleet until the end of the war. Undine was sold to be broken up in 1927 but was wrecked on the way to the breakers. The wreck was partially visible in 2013.

Design and development

Undine was one of eleven Modified  destroyers ordered by the British Admiralty in March 1916 as part of the Eighth War Construction Programme. The design was a development of the existing R class, adding features from the Yarrow Later M class which had been introduced based on wartime experience. The forward two boilers were transposed and vented through a single funnel, enabling the bridge and forward gun to be placed further aft. Combined with hull-strengthening, this improved the destroyers' ability to operate at high speed in bad weather.

Two funnels were fitted.

Armament consisted of three single  Mk V QF guns on the ship's centreline, with one on the forecastle, one aft on a raised platform and one between the funnels. A single 2-pounder  "pom-pom anti-aircraft gun was carried on a platform between two twin mounts for  torpedoes. The ship had a complement of 82 officers and ratings.

Construction and careers
Laid down by Fairfield Shipbuilding and Engineering Company of Govan on 23 September 1916, Undine was launched on 22 March 1917 and completed on 26 May. The vessel was the sixth of the name.

On commissioning, Undine joined the Fifteenth Destroyer Flotilla of the Grand Fleet, and served there until 1919. The destroyer was reduced to reserve on 22 February 1922. However, the Navy decided to retire many of the older destroyers in preparation for the introduction of newer and larger vessels. After being paid off on 28 September 1927, the ship was sold for scrapping to Thos. W. Ward of Briton Ferry in April 1928 but was wrecked en route off Horse Sand Fort, Portsmouth. The wreck was sold to the Middlesbrough Salvage Company on 27 August 1928 and was broken up on site, but the remains were still observable to sonar in 2013.

Pennant numbers

References

Citations

Bibliography

 
 
 
 
 
 

 

1917 ships
Ships built in Govan
Maritime incidents in 1928
R-class destroyers (1916)
World War I destroyers of the United Kingdom